Several ships have been named Benson:

 was launched in Liverpool as a West Indiaman. She sailed under a letter of marque and in December 1798 engaged  in a notable single-ship action in which she repelled an attack by a French naval corvette of superior force. Benson was wrecked on 23 March 1811.
  was launched at Quebec. She entered Lloyd's Register (LR) in 1813. She was condemned at Mauritius in 1817 and her loss gave rise to a notable court case.

Ship names